Antony Jack Durose is an English former cricketer active from 1964 to 1981 who played for Northamptonshire (Northants). He was born in Dukinfield, Cheshire on 5 October 1944. He appeared in 70 first-class matches as a righthanded batsman who bowled right arm fast medium pace. He scored 447 runs with a highest score of 30 and took 150 wickets with a best performance of seven for 23.

Notes

1944 births
English cricketers
Northamptonshire cricketers
Living people
Cheshire cricketers
Bedfordshire cricketers